José Bonifácio de Andrada e Silva (13 June 17636 April 1838) was a Brazilian statesman, naturalist, mineralist, professor and poet, born in Santos, São Paulo, then part of the Portuguese Empire. He was one of the most important mentors of Brazilian independence, and his actions were decisive for the success of Emperor Pedro I. He supported public education, was an abolitionist and suggested that a new national capital be created in Brazil's underdeveloped interior (effected over a century later as Brasília). His career as naturalist was marked by the discovery of four new minerals.

Life 
In 1800, Andrada e Silva was appointed professor of geology at Coimbra, and soon after inspector-general of the Portuguese mines; and in 1812 he was made perpetual secretary of the Lisbon Academy of Sciences. Returning to the colony in 1819, he urged Dom Pedro I to resist the recall of the Lisbon court, and was appointed one of his ministers in 1821. When the independence of Brazil was declared, Andrada e Silva became minister of the interior and of foreign affairs; and when it was established, he was again elected by the Constituent Assembly. He was also the author of the abolition project in Brazil, presented to the Constituent Assembly in 1823.  But his democratic principles resulted in his dismissal from office in July 1823.

Career in Europe 
José Bonifácio spent part of his life in Europe. In his travels around Europe he studied chemistry and mineralogy with other scientists. He collected data, carried out scientific experiments and discovered four new minerals and eight previously unknown species. The mineral andradite is named for him. Among his other discoveries was petalite, a lithium-containing material, first discovered by Andrade toward the end of the 18th century on a trip to Sweden; it was in this mineral that Swedish chemists first discovered lithium. He also was the first to discover another important lithium-containing mineral, spodumene, from the same source, the island of Utö in the Stockholm Archipelago of Sweden.

In 1797 he was elected a foreign member of the Royal Swedish Academy of Sciences.

Andrada e Silva graduated with degrees in Law and Natural Philosophy from Coimbra, he joined the Academia das Ciências de Lisboa (Science Academy of Lisbon). He taught Geognosy at the University of Coimbra in Portugal. Knowing twelve languages, he could speak four.

Return to Brazil 
In 1819, he travelled back to Brazil where he continued to conduct scientific research. A talented man having an unquiet temperament, he was also appointed Minister for Kingdom and Overseas Affairs and became the de facto prime minister.

His relationship with the prince became incompatible and he decided to join the opposition. In 1823 he was exiled and went to live in Bordeaux where, in 1825, come out his "Poesias Avulsas" (Sundry Poetries). To publish them he used the pseudonym Américo Elísio. On the dissolution of the Assembly in November (the Night of Agony), he was arrested and banished to France, where he lived in exile near Bordeaux until 1829, when he was permitted to return to Brazil.

In 1831 when Dom Pedro I abdicated from the throne, he was appointed by the former Emperor to be the tutor of the Emperor's son. Since he did not agree with the Regent's government he tried to reestablish the Empire. After being again arrested in 1833 and tried for intriguing on behalf of Dom Pedro I, he passed the rest of his days in retirement at the city of Niterói. He lost his duties of tutor and was accused of being a traitor, but he was eventually pardoned.

In December 1836, he contracted tuberculosis. He died of the disease on 6 April 1838 in Niterói.

Career in literature
José Bonifácio had also been engaged in Literature. His work Poesias Avulsas that come out in Bordeaux were republished in Brazil, in 1861, by the publisher Laemmert. In Brazil it received the title "Poesias" (Poetries) and the publication had the coordination of Joaquim Norberto de Sousa. In 1942 Afrânio Peixoto prepared another issue through the Brazilian Academy of Letters. This work, prefaced with a text by Sérgio Buarque de Holanda, was also published in a collection, as Volume I, idealized by the "Instituto Nacional do Livro" (The National Book Institute), appearing in 1946 with the title Poesias de Américo Elísio [Américo Elísio's Poetry]. His poetry shows a naturalistic pantheism that expresses his intellectual character and scientific curiosity.

His scientific, political and social works are published in Volume III, compiled and reproduced by Edgar Cerqueira Falcão with the title Obras científicas, politicas e sociais de José Bonifácio de Andrada e Silva. Its third edition came out in 1963 to celebrate the bicentennial of the Patriarch of the Independence.

The mineral andradite was named after José Bonifácio.

Gallery

Monuments

See also
 Statue of José Bonifácio de Andrada

References

Bibliography

 BARRETO, Vicente. Ideology and politics in the thought of José Bonifácio de Andrada e Silva. Rio de Janeiro: Zahar, 1977.
 
 Special issue of the bulletin of the Library of the Chamber of Deputies of Brazil. Bibliography regarding José Bonifácio. Brasilia, 1963.
 CALDEIRA, Jorge (org.). José Bonifácio de Andrada e Silva. (Col. Formadores do Brasil). São Paulo: Ed. 34. 2002.
 CAVALCANTE, Berenice. José Bonifácio: reason and sensibility, a history in three times. Rio de Janeiro: FGV, 2001.
 COELHO, José Maria Latino. Elogio Histórico de José Bonifácio. Rio de Janeiro: Edições Livros de Portugal, 1942.
 COSTA, Pedro Pereira da Silva. José Bonifácio. (Col. A vida dos grandes brasileiros, vol. 2). São Paulo: Editora Três, 1974.
 CRUZ, Guilherme Braga da. Coimbra and José Bonifácio de Andrada e Silva. Lisboa. Sep. "Memories of the Academy of Sciences of Lisbon – Class of Letters", 20, 1979.
 DOLNIKOFF, Miriam (org.). Projects for Brazil, José Bonifácio de Andrada e Silva. São Paulo: Cia. das Letras, 1998.
 DRUMOND, A. M. V. Annotations to a biography in vol. XIII dos Anais da Biblioteca Nacional.
 FALCÃO, Edgar Cerqueira de (org.). Scientific, political and social works of José Bonifácio de Andrada e Silva. Monumental edition celebrating the bicentennial anniversary of his birth (1963). Brasília: Câmara dos Deputados, 2006.
 GRAHAM, Maria. Journal of a voyage to Brazil and residence there during part of the years 1821, 1822, 1823. Belo Horizonte, Itatiaia; Publishing department of the University of São Paulo, 1990.
 MONTEIRO, Tobias. History of the Brazilian Empire. Rio de Janeiro: F. Briguiet & Cia. Editora, 1927, 1938.
 ROCHA POMBO, José Francisco da. History of Brazil. Edited by Helio Vianna. São Paulo: Edições Melhoramentos, 1963.
 SENADO FEDERAL. Political works of José Bonifácio. Brasília, 1972.
 SILVA, Ana Rosa Cloclet da. Building of the nation and slavery in the thought of Jose Bonifacio: 1783 – 1823. Campinas: Editora da Unicamp, 1999.
 SOUSA, Octávio Tarquínio de. História dos fundadores do Império do Brasil. (Vol. 1.) Rio de Janeiro: Livraria José Olympio Editora, 2ª edição, revista.
 SOUSA, Octávio Tarquínio de. José Bonifácio. Belo Horizonte: Editora Itatiaia, 1988.
 SOUSA, Alberto. The Andradas (3 vols.). São Paulo: Typographia Piratininga, 1922.
 VARELA, Alex Gonçalves. I swear by my honor as a good vassal and good Portuguese man. An analisis of the scientific annotations of José Bonifácio de Andrada e Silva (1780–1819). São Paulo: Annablume, 2006.

External links

1763 births
1838 deaths
People from Santos, São Paulo
18th-century Brazilian people
19th-century Brazilian people
Brazilian abolitionists
Brazilian geologists
Brazilian mineralogists
Brazilian people of Portuguese descent
University of Coimbra alumni
Members of the Royal Swedish Academy of Sciences
Government ministers of Brazil
Foreign ministers of Brazil
Brazilian monarchists
Knights of the Military Order of Christ